José Lino Montes Góngora is a Mexican weightlifter. He competed at the 2012 Summer Olympics in the Men's 56 kg, finishing 6th.

Background
Montes was born on April 18, 1989, in Yucatán, Mexico. He competed in the 2012 London Olympics, with the nickname "Hércules Tekaxeño" and coached by Lazaro Medina Lugo.

Montes won bronze medals in snatch and clean and jerk during the 2014 Pan American Sports Festival.

References

Mexican male weightlifters
Living people
Olympic weightlifters of Mexico
Weightlifters at the 2012 Summer Olympics
Pan American Games medalists in weightlifting
Pan American Games bronze medalists for Mexico
1989 births
People from Yucatán
Weightlifters at the 2011 Pan American Games
Medalists at the 2011 Pan American Games
20th-century Mexican people
21st-century Mexican people